Borów  is a village in the administrative district of Gmina Świebodzin, within Świebodzin County, Lubusz Voivodeship, in western Poland.

Notable residents
 Kurt Student (1890–1978), Luftwaffe general

References

Villages in Świebodzin County